The General Asbestos and Rubber Company (GARCO) Main Mill (also known as simply GARCO) is a historic industrial facility located in Park Circle in North Charleston, South Carolina.  GARCO was a major regional employer, supplying products to the American space program, including the soles of the spacesuit boots used in the first moon landing.  The main mill building was built in 1915, and also provided materials to the military efforts in both world wars.

When the plant was built, the company also built 20 bungalows of various designs to house some of the white workers; black workers were housed elsewhere at the edge of North Charleston. The mill was listed on the National Register of Historic Places in 2017. The structure is currently being renovated. When completed, the restored GARCO will house stores, housing, and restaurants.

See also
National Register of Historic Places listings in Charleston County, South Carolina

References

National Register of Historic Places in Charleston County, South Carolina
Buildings and structures in Charleston County, South Carolina
Industrial buildings and structures on the National Register of Historic Places in South Carolina